Washboarding or corrugation is the formation of periodic, transverse ripples in the surface of gravel and dirt roads. Washboarding occurs in dry, granular road material with repeated traffic, traveling at speeds above . Washboarding creates an uncomfortable ride for the occupants of traversing vehicles and hazardous driving conditions for vehicles that travel too fast to maintain traction and control.

Mechanism
Washboarding or corrugation of roads comprises a series of ripples, which occur with the passage of wheels rolling over unpaved roads at speeds sufficient to cause bouncing of the wheel on the initially unrippled surface and take on the appearance of a laundry washboard. Most studies of washboarding pertain to granular materials, including sand and gravel. However, other work suggests that the phenomenon may occur in material which has some binding of particles, e.g. clay-like soils.

Highway department experts in the mid-1920s were aware that traffic volume and speed were primary causes of corrugations on gravel roads and cited the role of drive wheels tossing material as a factor.

Laboratory-scale studies of the phenomenon typically employ a wheel or a blade, which is towed behind a pivot point, tracing a circular path through a pan of the material under examination. These studies have investigated a variety of granular and viscous, even fluid, materials. In the laboratory, washboarding has been studied for a range of parameters, including the thickness and grain size of the material for varied wheel sizes, shapes, and masses. Experiments produced ripples for each parameter, above a threshold speed, when the wheel (or blade) began to bounce. Experiments also show that the pattern can move either against the direction of motion or in the direction of motion. They also show that a passive, non-driving wheel suffices to create corrugations and that displacement of material, rather than ejection, is the dominant mechanism.

Several articles about real-life washboarding on roads cite South Dakota Local Transportation Assistance Program (LTAP) Special Bulletin #29,  “Dealing with Washboarding,” by Ken Skorseth. Those sources attribute washboarding to three causes: dry granular materials, vehicle speeds, and the quality of the granular material. Other factors cited include vehicle speed, traffic volume, and hard acceleration or braking. The sources also claim that light vehicles are more likely to cause washboarding than heavy trucks.

Maintenance
Highway department guidance suggests that choice of gravel can be key to mitigating washboarding. They cite "sieve analysis" tests that use a series of screens or sieves to characterize the sizes of particles contained within a gravel sample. Highway department guidance suggests a range of particle sizes from stones that are in the  range, mixed with progressively finer particles to include a small fraction of fine particles that bind the larger particles together. They also mention the role of equipment that can re-blend and smooth surfaces that have corrugated.

In 1925, the Nevada Department of Highways advocated mitigating corrugations with crushed pit-run gravel, using material  and smaller, including only the fines from crushing. Contemporaneous advice from Colorado was to use a well-graded gravel, not exceeding  and including 25–40% fines passing a  sieve, but not more than 5% passing a #10 (2.0-mm) sieve. The maintenance advice from Colorado was to drag or grade the road frequently, applying light volumes of new gravel with minimal sand content and providing good drainage with a crown. The same source advises reduction of traffic speed.

Guidance based on South Dakota LTAP Special Bulletin #29 and FHWA guidance (2000) from the same source suggests that the surface gravel "should be a blend of stone, sand and fines that will compact into a dense, tight mass with an almost impervious surface." It emphasizes the proper gradation of gravel—100% passing the ) sieve—to have fractured stone to "interlock" and 4–15% fines passing the #200 (75-μm) sieve to act as a binder and create cohesiveness in the gravel; substituting other binders, such as clay is also recommended. Alternately, one can incorporate reclaimed asphalt in a half-and-half blend with quarried gravel to improve the binding properties of the surface. For existing washboarded surfaces, the bulletin recommends using a grader to cut and blend existing material to a depth one inch or more below the bottom of the washboarded segment and then add the new material into the top layer. Useful equipment includes a blade with rotating scarifying teeth or a replaceable bit-type cutting edge attached to the moldboard blade of the earth-moving equipment.

References

External links 
 Driving on a washboard road (Slow motion)
 

Roads
Road hazards
Pattern formation